Wuhan Jianghan University F.C. (Chinese: 武汉江汉大学足球俱乐部) is a Chinese professional football club located in Wuhan. They compete in the Chinese Women's Super League, and their home stadium is Tazihu Football Training Centre.

History 

Wuhan Jianghan University F.C. was founded in 2001 as a cooperation between Jianghan University and the Wuhan football association.

In 2017, the team won the first honour in its history, winning the 2017 China Women's League One title to achieve promotion to the China Women's Super League for the first time in its history. In the 2018 China Women's Super League season, they finished fourth.

At the 2019 FIFA Women's World Cup they had five representatives in the China national team selected for the competition. Following the tournament, they re-signed former player Wang Shuang after a season at Paris Saint-Germain ahead of the 2019 China Women's Super League campaign.

Current squad 
Updated: 14 August 2022

Honours

Leagues 
Chinese Women's Super League
Champions (3): 2020, 2021, 2022 Chinese Women's Super League

Chinese Women's League One
Champions (1): 2017,

References 

Chinese Women's Super League clubs
2001 establishments in China
Association football clubs established in 2001
Sport in Wuhan
Sport in Hubei